Carrie Moyer is an American painter and writer living in Brooklyn, New York. Moyer's paintings and public art projects have been exhibited both in the US and Europe since the early 1990s.

Life and work
Carrie Moyer is a painter and writer who has been showing her work since the mid-1990s. Her work has been widely exhibited at national and international venues including MoMA PS1 the Tang, Worcester Art Museum, Weatherspoon Art Museum, Cooper-Hewitt National Design Museum of the Smithsonian Institution and American University Museums; Shedhalle (Zurich) and Project Art Space (Dublin) among others.

Carrie Moyer, born in Detroit, Michigan in 1960, received a BFA from Pratt Institute in 1985, an MA in Computer Graphics from New York Institute of Technology and an MFA from the Milton Avery Graduate School of the Arts at Bard College in 2001. Moyer studied modern dance until she was in a serious car accident that forced her to shelve dancing and focus on painting. She still incorporates dance and movement in her art. In 1995 she was a student at the Skowhegan School of Painting and Sculpture. Moyer has been awarded numerous grants, awards and residencies including a Joan Mitchell Foundation Painters and Sculptors Grant and an Anonymous Was A Woman Award (both 2009), Creative Capital Award (2000), Elaine de Kooning Memorial Fellowship (1999), Peter Norton Family Foundation Project Grant (1999) and the National Studio Program at PS1/Institute for Contemporary Art, New York, NY (1996). She is a Professor and serves as the Director of MFA Program in Studio Art at Hunter College. Moyer was represented by CANADA Gallery in New York City from 2003 until 2015; she is now represented by DC Moore Gallery.

For the past two decades, Carrie Moyer’s paintings have merged abstract aesthetics and political imagery. Complex and seductive paintings layer vividly colored and textured biomorphic forms with a range of historical, stylistic and physical references that include Color Field, Social Realist, and Surrealist paintings, 1960s and ’70s counter culture graphics, 1970s feminist art, and bodily forms and fluids. Moyer often works on the floor, pouring, rolling, stippling, mopping, and hand-working the paint, as well as adding sections of glitter.

Critic Martha Schwendener has written about Moyer's paintings: 
"Painting is a neurotically self-conscious medium—it's always looking over its shoulder, responding to earlier eras and earlier ideas. Carrie Moyer puts that self-consciousness at the center of her work. But where mash-ups of different periods and styles have become popular with post-postmodern painters (and often end up looking like conceptual train wrecks), her canvases are cool, seamless—almost alchemical."

By juxtaposing the ancient, modern, and contemporary, Moyer rips images out of their old contexts and circulates them in a new one—"cross-wiring," she calls it. Slipping between abstract and representational, the raw canvases are built up with strata of translucent and opaque color, positive and negative shapes, and solids and silhouettes that reference different historical periods: ancient fertility figures with bulging hips; vases with breasts circling their perimeters; murky blobs that recall the paintings of biomorphic Surrealism. These juxtapositions make a commentary on an unsettling subtext here, a suggestion of the way women have served as talismanic muse-objects in past art instead of intelligent innovators.

In October 2019 Carrie Moyer was elected as a full member of the NAD (National Academy of Design). Her most recent shows include a solo exhibition, Carrie Moyer: Interstellar , at the Worcester Art Museum, and Carrie Moyer: Pirate Jenny at the Tang Museum. In 2020, Carrie Moyer and Sheila Pepe were the subject of a two-person exhibition, Carrie Moyer and Sheila Pepe: Tabernacles for Trying Times at the Portland Museum of Art, Maine.

Dyke Action Machine!
Between 1991 and 2008, Moyer was one half of Dyke Action Machine! (DAM!), a public art project that she founded with photographer Sue Schaffner. One of the first queer interventionist public art projects, DAM!  dissected mainstream visual culture by inserting lesbian images into commercial contexts. It began as working group of the 90s activist organization, Queer Nation, and evolved into a stand-alone agitprop duo that was active for 17 years. DAM! campaigns usually involved about 5,000 posters wheat pasted over the course of a month, particularly in neighborhoods with high volume and diverse pedestrians. Dyke Action Machine! produced over 15 projects during the course of their collaboration.

Throughout the 1990s, Moyer designed agitprop, graphics and posters for a number of gay and lesbian activist organizations based in New York City. These include Queer Nation, the Lesbian Avengers, the Irish Lesbian and Gay Organization (ILGO) and the New York City Anti-Violence Project.

Art reviews and essays
Moyer's writing has appeared in Art in America, Artforum, Modern Painters, the Brooklyn Rail and other publications. Since 1997, her essays have also been included in a range of anthologies – from Queers in Space: Communities, Public Spaces and Sites of Resistance (Bay Press, 1997) to The Studio Reader: On the Space of Artists (Michelle Grabner and Mary Jane Jacobs, editors; University of Chicago Press, 2010).

Selected writings
 "Carrie Moyer." Grabner, Michelle and Mary Jane Jacobs, eds. The Studio Reader: On the Space of Artists. Chicago. University of Chicago Press, 2010
 Moyer, Carrie. "So Appealing, So Different: Carrie Moyer on the Women of Pop," Artforum, April 2010
 Moyer, Carrie. "Alina Szapocznikow: My American Dream," The Brooklyn Rail, October 2010
 Moyer, Carrie. "Maria Lassnig: The Pitiless Eye," Art in America, January 2009
 Moyer, Carrie. "Dona Nelson: Brain Stain," The Brooklyn Rail, October 2006

References

External links
 DC Moore Gallery
 Dyke Action Machine!
 Dyke Action Machine!, "Gynadome: a Separate Paradise" funded by Creative Capital
The Brooklyn Rail In Conversation Carrie Moyer and Phong Bui
 The Lesbian Avengers
 Carrie Moyer website
 Art & Queer Culture book

Living people
1960 births
American women painters
20th-century American painters
21st-century American painters
20th-century American women artists
21st-century American women artists
New York Institute of Technology alumni
Lesbian Avengers members